Koray Çölgeçen (born 28 May 1985 in İzmir, Turkey) is a Turkish football player who plays as a defender for Tokatspor.

Honours 
 Kayserispor
Turkish Cup (1): 2008

References

External links
 Guardian Stats Centre
 

1985 births
Living people
Turkish footballers
Turkey under-21 international footballers
Turkey youth international footballers
MKE Ankaragücü footballers
Bucaspor footballers
Kayserispor footballers
Denizlispor footballers
Adanaspor footballers
Balıkesirspor footballers
Süper Lig players
Association football defenders